Vera Petrovna Maretskaya (Russian: Вера Петровна Марецкая) was a Soviet and Russian stage and film actress. People's Artist of the USSR (1949) and Hero of Socialist Labour (1976).

Early years
Vera Petrovna Maretskaya was born in Barvikha, a suburb of Moscow. She helped her father Pyotr, who was a candy bar vendor at Moscow Circus. Maretskaya was auditioned by Yevgeny Vakhtangov and studied at Vakhtangov Theatre School, from which she graduated as an actress in 1924. That same year she became permanent member of Theatre-Studio led by Yuri Zavadsky. She soon married him, and they had one son. They remained lifelong friends and stage partners, even after the end of their brief marriage.

Life and career
In 1925, Maretskaya made her film debut in The Tailor from Torzhok. She played roles in fifteen silent films. In 1937 Maretskaya suffered from political execution of her two brothers, journalists Dmitri and Gregori, who were the followers of opposition politician Nikolai Bukharin.

Maretskaya appealed to the Soviet government, but her appeal was ignored. Her brothers were executed by gunshots during the purges of the "Great Terror" under the dictatorship of Joseph Stalin. She lost her second husband, a young actor, named Georgi Troitsky, who was killed in action in 1941, during the Second World War. She took care of her own two children, and also adopted the children of her executed brothers. She was supported by Yuri Zavadsky.

By 1940, she was made one the faces of Soviet propaganda films. She shot to fame after the leading role in 'Chlen pravitelstva' (Member of the Government 1940) by directors Aleksandr Zarkhi and Iosif Kheifits. For that role she was awarded the Stalin's Prize. At that time the Zavadsky's Theatre-Studio merged with the Mossovet Theatre, and in 1940, Maretskaya became permanent member of the Mossoveta Theatre.

Later years
Maretskaya suffered from breast cancer during the last ten years of her life, and was later diagnosed with brain cancer, but continued her acting career on Moscow Radio. At that time she created popular radio shows based on her adaptations of Woman Without Love and The Art of Living, both by writer André Maurois.

Honors and awards
In 1976 Maretskaya was designated the Hero of Socialist Labour. She was awarded the Stalin Prize four times (1942, 1946, 1948, 1951) and was made the People's Artist of the USSR (1949).

Death
Maretskaya died on 17 August 1978, aged 72, and was laid to rest in Novodevichy Cemetery in Moscow.

Filmography
His Call (1925)
The Tailor from Torzhok (1925)
Don Diego and Pelagia (1927)
The Yellow Ticket (1927)
The House on Trubnaya (1928)
The Living Corpse (1928)
Two-Buldi-Two (1929)
The Four Visits of Samuel Wolfe (1934)
Dawn of Paris (1936)
Member of the Government (1939) 
The Artamonov Business (1941) 
Kotovsky (1942) 
She Defends the Motherland (1943) 
The Wedding (1944)
The Village Teacher (1947)
They Have a Motherland (1949)
Mother (1955)
An Easy Life (1964)

References

External links

1906 births
1978 deaths
20th-century Russian actresses
Actresses from Moscow
People from Odintsovsky District
Heroes of Socialist Labour
Honored Artists of the RSFSR
People's Artists of the RSFSR
People's Artists of the USSR
Stalin Prize winners
Recipients of the Order of Lenin
Recipients of the Order of the Red Banner of Labour
Russian film actresses
Russian silent film actresses
Russian stage actresses
Soviet film actresses
Soviet silent film actresses
Soviet stage actresses
Deaths from brain tumor
Deaths from breast cancer
Deaths from cancer in the Soviet Union
Burials at Novodevichy Cemetery